Hard problem may refer to:

 The Hard Problem, a 2015 play by Tom Stoppard
 Hard problems, in computational complexity theory 
 Hard problem of consciousness, explaining why we have qualitative phenomenal experiences